Luciola intricata, is a species of firefly beetle found in Sri Lanka. 

Body is about 6.1 mm long. Dorsum yellowish brown with dark tipped elytral apices. Head dingy yellowish brown with a darker brown median line. Labrum brown brownish. Antennal sockets very close. The broad apical labial palpomere the inner margin is dentate.

References 

Lampyridae
Insects of Sri Lanka
Beetles described in 1858